The Piece Talks is the debut LP by hip-hop group C.R.A.C., made up of rapper Blu and rapper-producer Ta'Raach. C.R.A.C is an acronym standing for "Collect Respect Anna Check". Though the duo initially released the project independently, Tres Records became interested and decided to release the album commercially on April 22, 2008. Not purely a rap album, many tracks prominently feature singing and talking and are more like skits than full songs.

Track listing
 What Up (Part 2)
 Buy Me Lunch
 Love Don't
 Major Way
 Activate Too
 CRACHAUSE
 Respect 
 Pop Dem Boyz
 2.16.05
 Mr. Big Fizz
 Chill
 Hello!?
 Go!
 Activate...As Well
 Bullet Through Me
 Cotton
 Credits
 Umm Yeah
 Ready

References 

Blu (rapper) albums
2008 albums